Madonna and Child with Saint Dominic and Saint Martha of Bethany is a 1517-1520 oil on canvas painting by Andrea Previtali produced for the monastery of Santa Marta (dedicated to Saint Martha) in Bergamo and since 2010 in the collections of the UBI Banca in Bergamo.

No record of the work's commissioner survives, but other information on the work strongly suggests it was for the cell of a monk of the monastery of Santa Marta near the church of San Leonardo, such as its dimensions, too large for an ordinary private devotional altarpiece but too small for one commissioned by a church. Saint Martha has her usual attributes (a Tarasque and the bowl of holy water with which she tamed it) and wears a Dominican habit, whilst Saint Dominic on the left holds a model of a large three-naved 15th-century-style church, possibly representing the church of Santo Stefano in the city. This includes two figures in its doorway, possibly St Dominic himself and Saint Stephen in the red dalmatic of a deacon and a martyr. The artist had important contacts with the Dominicans of Bergamo which also led to a commission for an Annunciation fresco in Santo Stefano, lost in the church's destruction in 1561 to build the Venetian Walls

The art historian Carlo Marenzi also made a note on Vite de' pittori, scultori e architetti bergamaschi by Francesco Tassi describing the work as being in the home of Andrea Pasta, a historian active in Bergamo at the time of the monastery's suppression on 21 June 1798 and the French occupation and therefore in a position to save the work and his daughters:

The work then passed into Vincenzo Polli's collection until 1960, when it passed into a private collection and then to its present owners

References

Bibliography

External links
 

Paintings by Andrea Previtali
Paintings of the Madonna and Child
Paintings in Bergamo
Paintings of Martha
Paintings of Saint Dominic